The 2006 Copa Sudamericana Finals was a two-legged football contest, played in November and December 2006, to determine the champion of the 2006 Copa Sudamericana. The teams taking part were Chilean side Colo-Colo, and Mexican side Pachuca. The first leg, played in Pachuca, resulted in a 1–1 draw. The second leg, in Santiago, was won 2–1 by Pachuca, making them the cup winners for that year.

Despite being from Mexico –which is a member nation of CONCACAF and not CONMEBOL– Pachuca were eligible to compete in this tournament after winning the 2006 Mexican Primera División, earning them an invite from CONMEBOL and receiving an automatic berth directly to the knockout stages. Pachuca's victory in the final marked the first time in history that a representative of CONCACAF won a CONMEBOL-sanctioned tournament.

Qualified teams

For the second time, a Mexican team, and the first time Pachuca qualified for the final. This was also the first time Colo-Colo qualified for the final. This marked the first time both teams faced each other since CONCACAF representatives started participating in the tournament since 2005.

This also marked the first time an Argentine team did not qualify to the Copa Sudamericana final, since the inaugural edition in 2002.

Route to the final

Format
The final was played on a home-and-away two-legged basis, with Colo-Colo hosting the second leg. The away goals rule was not applied, and extra time would be played if the aggregate score was tied after the second leg. If the aggregate score was still tied after extra time, a penalty shoot-out would have been used to determine the winner.

Match details

First leg

Second leg

References

Copa Sudamericana Finals
s
s
s
s
s